is a railway station on the Hokuriku Railroad Ishikawa Line in the city of Hakusan, Ishikawa, Japan, operated by the private railway operator Hokuriku Railroad (Hokutetsu).

Lines

Station layout
The station consists of one island platform serving two tracks, connected to the station building by a level crossing. The station is unattended.

Adjacent stations

History
Dōhōji Station opened on 22 June 1915.

Surrounding area
 Ishikawa Prefectural Route 179
 Kuragatake (about 2 hours' walk)
 Hayashi Tsurugi Post Office

See also
 List of railway stations in Japan

References

External links

  

Railway stations in Ishikawa Prefecture
Railway stations in Japan opened in 1915
Hokuriku Railroad Ishikawa Line
Hakusan, Ishikawa